Issorium (Ἰσσώριον; Issṓrion) is a hill on the northern city border of Sparta, with a sanctuary to Artemis Isora, possibly the heights known today as Klaraki. It was a temple dedicated to Diana, and was also called Isoria, pitanatis.

References

Sparta
Hills of Greece
Temples of Artemis